José Garcia (born 10 February 1964) is a Portuguese sprint canoeist who competed from the late 1980s to the late 1990s. He won a bronze medal in the K-1 10000 m event at the 1989 ICF Canoe Sprint World Championships in Plovdiv.

Garcia also competed in three Summer Olympics, earning his best finish of sixth in the K-1 1000 m event at Barcelona in 1992.

References

Sports-reference.com profile

1964 births
Canoeists at the 1988 Summer Olympics
Canoeists at the 1992 Summer Olympics
Canoeists at the 1996 Summer Olympics
Living people
Olympic canoeists of Portugal
Portuguese male canoeists
ICF Canoe Sprint World Championships medalists in kayak